Sushi repeat-containing protein SRPX2 is a protein that in humans is encoded by the SRPX2 gene, on the X chromosome. It has roles in glutamatergic synapse formation in the cerebral cortex and is more highly expressed in childhood. Bioinformatics analysis suggests the SRPX2 protein is a peroxiredoxin.

Function 
SRPX2 is distributed on synapses throughout the cerebral cortex and hippocampus, largely in the same areas as vesicular glutamate transporter 1 and DLG4. It is involved in synapse formation and is more highly expressed in childhood. Overexpression of SRPX2 results in increased density of vesicular glutamate transporter 1 and DLG4 clusters on cortical neurons. Deficiency results in decreased dendritic spine density of excitatory glutamatergic synapses, while inhibitory GABAergic synapses are unaffected. Length or shape of spines is not affected by SPRX2, however.

Clinical significance 
Mutations in SRPX2 were linked in one 2006 study to a family with a form of Rolandic epilepsy with intellectual disability and speech dyspraxia, however later studies showed that mutations in SRPX2 do not necessarily lead to epilepsy or intellectual disability. Additionally, no mutations in SRPX2 have been reported with Rolandic epilepsy since. In mice, mutations in SRPX2 lead to decreased frequency of ultrasonic vocalisations in pups when separated from mothers.

Interactions 
FOXP2 directly reduces SRPX2 expression, by binding to its promoter. However, FOXP2 also reduces dendritic length, which SRPX2 does not affect, indicating it has other regulatory roles in dendritic morphology.

References

Further reading 

 
 
 
 
 
 

Extracellular matrix proteins